Yang Tianshi (born 15 February 1936) is a Chinese historian who is a professor at the Graduate School of the Chinese Academy of Social Sciences. He is a member of the Chinese Academy of Social Sciences and the Central Research Institute of Culture and History. He has been hailed as first person from the Chinese mainland to study Chiang Kai-shek.

Biography
Yang was born in Dongtai, Jiangsu, on February 15, 1936. He attended Tianxia Town Central Primary School. He secondary studied at Wuxi No.1 High School. In 1955, he entered Peking University, where he majored in Chinese. After graduation, he was assigned to Bayi Agricultural Machinery School. In February 1962, he was hired as a teacher at the High School Affiliated to Beijing Normal University. During the Cultural Revolution, he was labeled as a "bourgeois intellectual". He worked for 16 years until he was assigned to the Institute of Modern History of the Chinese Academy of Social Sciences as an assistant research fellow in 1978. He was promoted to associate research fellow in 1983 and to research fellow in 1988. Yang Tianshi was employed as the doctoral supervisor of the Graduate School of the Chinese Academy of Social Sciences in 1994 and was employed as a member of the Central Research Institute of Culture and History in September 1998.

Works

References

1936 births
Living people
People from Dongtai
Chinese historians
Peking University alumni